The Macure were an Albanian tribe that lived on the territory on the part of Montenegro which is today known as Šekular. Bratonožići and Rovci. Like other non-Slavic tribes of Montenegro, they were either assimilated or expelled. The majority of scholars consider them to have been of Albanian  origin. Today, their name is preserved in local Serbian legends and myths, while their name is sometimes used in Montenegro as derogative.

Origin 
Milan Šufflay was the first to set the hypothesis that Macure were of Albanian origin, like Mataguži, Maine, Malonšići and Bukumiri. This hypothesis about Macure was accepted by many other authors, including Pantelić. Vladimir Ćorović presented a hypothesis that one of the possibilities is that Macure are related to Albanian Macarke or Macreke.

Jovan Erdeljanović believed they were of Vlach origin whose name was derived from some Roman word which basis was mazz.

Etymology 

Macure might be related to the Montenegrin word maca meaning large hammer but it is used also to describe very strong as this word is used even today by people in Montenegro to describe a strong man by saying Jak ko maca! or Maca od čo'jeka. Also, it is common to find Montenegrin words that are of Slavic roots and end with "ure", for example Ljušture (meaning multiple layers), and Đevojčure ( plural: girls). This might indicate origin of name Macure is as to say multiple of strong people.

History 
Like all other non-Slavic tribes of Montenegro, Macure were also completely assimilated or expelled by Slavs. Macure became a derogative term in Montenegro, which is the case with names of other conquered and expelled tribes of Lužani, Bukumiri, Mataruge and others.

With Ottoman incursion into Serbian Despotovina and Zeta, Macure, Mataruge and Kriči migrated in two directions. The first was across Eastern Bosnia and Central Bosnia, into Western and North Western Bosnia. The second was across Herzegovina and Dalmatia.

Legacy 
Macure are commemorated in Serbian legends and myths. According to Serbian legends, they were tall and strong people. The Serb legends say that they saw snow for the first time when they came to Sinjajevina in Montenegro and made a snowball to bring it back to show it to their friends which soon melt in their hands.

According to Erdeljanović, the toponym Macur-jama in Piperi territory has its origin in the name of the Macure tribe.

A word Macurovine, a first name Macur (recorded in 1575) and a surname Macura (recorded since 17th century) is derived from the name of the Macure tribe.

References

Sources 

 
 
 
 
 
 

Medieval Montenegro
Tribes of Montenegro